Catherine Oxenberg (born September 22, 1961) is an American actress. She is best known for her role as Amanda Carrington on the 1980s prime time soap opera Dynasty. Oxenberg is the daughter of Princess Elizabeth of Yugoslavia and her first husband, Howard Oxenberg (1919-2010). She twice played Diana, Princess of Wales on screen, in The Royal Romance of Charles and Diana (1982) and Charles and Diana: Unhappily Ever After (1992) and has appeared in many other films.

Early life
Oxenberg was born in New York City, and grew up in London. She is the eldest daughter of Princess Elizabeth of Yugoslavia (born 1936) and her first husband Howard Oxenberg (1919–2010), a Jewish dress manufacturer and close friend of the Kennedy family. Her sister is Christina Oxenberg. Princess Elizabeth is the only daughter of Prince Paul of Yugoslavia (who served as regent for his cousin's eldest son King Peter II of Yugoslavia) and Princess Olga of Greece and Denmark.  

Through her maternal grandmother, Catherine is a first cousin once removed of: Prince Edward, Duke of Kent, Princess Alexandra, The Honourable Lady Ogilvy and Prince Michael of Kent.  Oxenberg is also a second cousin once removed of Queen Sofía of Spain and Charles III of the United Kingdom, making Catherine a third cousin of Felipe VI of Spain and Prince William, Prince of Wales. 

Princess Olga was the sister of Princess Marina, who married Prince George, Duke of Kent (an uncle of Queen Elizabeth II). Olga and Marina were also paternal first cousins of the Duke of Edinburgh, husband of Queen Elizabeth II. They were also related to brothers Prince Nicholas of Greece and Denmark and Prince Andrew of Greece and Denmark.

Oxenberg was educated at the Lycée Français Charles de Gaulle in Kensington, London, St. Paul's School, and Columbia University, though she did not finish college.

Film and television
Oxenberg made her acting debut in the 1982 made-for-television film The Royal Romance of Charles and Diana, in which she played Diana, Princess of Wales. In 1984, Oxenberg joined the hit ABC prime time soap opera Dynasty — then at its height of popularity — in the role of Amanda Carrington. Oxenberg left Dynasty in 1986, following a salary dispute after the end of her second season, and the role was recast with Karen Cellini. Though Oxenberg's publicist insisted that the actress left Dynasty voluntarily, several media outlets reported that she was fired.

Oxenberg was the guest host on the May 10, 1986, episode of Saturday Night Live, making her the only descendant of a royal family to host the show. Oxenberg starred as Princess Elysa in the 1987 television film Roman Holiday. She also appeared in The Lair of the White Worm in 1988, and reprised the role of Diana, Princess of Wales in the TV film Charles and Diana: Unhappily Ever After in 1992. From 1993 to 1994, she starred in the short-lived series Acapulco H.E.A.T..

Oxenberg was portrayed by Rachael Taylor in the 2005 telemovie Dynasty: The Making of a Guilty Pleasure, a fictionalized retelling of the behind-the-scenes goings-on during the production of Dynasty. In 2006, Oxenberg appeared in the TV special, Dynasty Reunion: Catfights & Caviar, in which she was reunited with her former Dynasty castmates to reminisce about the series.

In 2019, Catherine Oxenberg produced and narrated Escaping the NXIVM Cult: A Mother's Fight to Save Her Daughter where Andrea Roth portrayed her.

Personal life
In the Class of 1985 Harvard freshman face book, Oxenberg is listed directly ahead of Conan O'Brien. A contemporary Harvard Crimson piece indicates that she was at least initially in the Class of 1983, dubbing her "queen of the facebook".

In June 1991, Oxenberg had a daughter, India Riven Oxenberg, whose father was later revealed to be the convicted drug smuggler William Weitz Shaffer. Shaffer and India were in contact during her childhood, even while he was in prison. In December 1992, Oxenberg was living with her daughter in Coldwater Canyon, Los Angeles, California. 

Oxenberg's first marriage was to the producer Robert Evans, in Beverly Hills, California, on July 12, 1998, but the marriage was annulled nine days later.

Oxenberg met the actor Casper Van Dien during the filming of the 1999 TV movie The Collectors, and they worked together again the same year in the  Evangelical Christian thriller The Omega Code. On May 8, 1999, they were married at the Graceland Wedding Chapel in Las Vegas, Nevada. Van Dien had a son and a daughter from a previous marriage, Casper Robert Mitchum Van Dien and Caroline Grace Van Dien. Van Dien and Oxenberg have two daughters, Amanda Maya Van Dien (2001) and Celeste Alma Van Dien (2003). In 2005, the couple appeared in their own reality series, I Married a Princess, which aired on the Lifetime Television channel in the United States and on LIVINGtv in the United Kingdom. Van Dien filed for divorce from Oxenberg in 2015.

While Oxenberg and Van Dien were married, and before India joined NXIVM, Oxenberg and Van Dien were celebrity ambassadors for the non-profit organization Childhelp.

Oxenberg acknowledged, in November 2017, that she had had interactions with Keith Raniere and his NXIVM organization, bringing her daughter India into NXIVM in 2011 for what she thought would be "a self-help, business-oriented program". Oxenberg confirmed that her daughter became heavily involved in the cult, and that she had initiated what proved to be a failed intervention for India. In August 2018, Oxenberg revealed that India had left NXIVM in June, after the arrest of Raniere, and they were working on their relationship. In August 2018, Oxenberg's book Captive: A Mother's Crusade to Save Her Daughter from a Terrifying Cult co-written by former People Magazine writer Natasha Stoynoff was published.

In 2020, Oxenberg was featured in The Vow, a documentary series for HBO, directed by Jehane Noujaim and Karim Amer, which follows Oxenberg’s attempts to rescue her daughter India. Oxenberg also appears in Seduced: Inside the NXIVM Cult a documentary series for Starz, directed by Cecilia Peck and Inbal B. Lessner, which features India speaking out about her experiences for the first time.

Filmography 

For playing Amanda Carrington, Oxenberg won two Soap Opera Digest Awards in 1985, for Outstanding Supporting Actress and Outstanding Female Newcomer.

Ancestry

Through her maternal grandfather, Prince Paul of Yugoslavia of the House of Karađorđević, Catherine Oxenberg is a great-great-great-granddaughter of Karađorđe, who started the First Serbian Uprising against the Ottoman Empire in 1804. Her maternal grandmother, Princess Olga, was the daughter of Grand Duchess Elena Vladimirovna of Russia and Prince Nicholas of Greece and Denmark, himself the son of another Romanov grand duchess, Queen Olga Konstantinovna of the Hellenes and her Danish-born husband King George of Greece, brother of Queen Alexandra of the United Kingdom and the Empress Maria Fyodorovna.

References

External links
 
 
 Catherine Oxenberg's Watch Over Me profile - MyNetworkTV.com
 
 

1961 births
Living people
20th-century American actresses
21st-century American actresses
Actresses from London
Actresses from New York City
American emigrants to England
American film actresses
American people of Danish descent
American people of Finnish descent
American people of German-Russian descent
American people of Russian-Jewish descent
American people of Serbian descent
American people of Swedish descent
American soap opera actresses
American socialites
American television actresses
American Ashkenazi Jews
Columbia University alumni
Harvard University alumni
Jewish American actresses
Karađorđević dynasty
Catherine
People educated at Lycée Français Charles de Gaulle
St. Paul's School (New Hampshire) alumni
Evans family (Paramount Pictures)
Royalty and nobility actors